Rodrigo Thompson Rocha, known as Rodrigo Thompson (born 1 June 1993) is a Brazilian football player who plays for Lusitano VRSA.

Club career
He made his professional debut in the Segunda Liga for UD Oliveirense on 15 August 2015 in a game against Farense.

References

1993 births
Sportspeople from Rio de Janeiro (state)
Living people
Brazilian footballers
Esporte Clube Bahia players
U.D. Oliveirense players
Brazilian expatriate footballers
Expatriate footballers in Portugal
Liga Portugal 2 players
G.D. Tourizense players
Association football forwards
Esporte Clube São João da Barra players